In the mathematical field of topology, a free loop is a variant of the mathematical notion of a loop. Whereas a loop has a distinguished point on it, called a basepoint, a free loop lacks such a distinguished point. Formally, let  be a topological space. Two loops are equivalent if they differ by a reparameterization of the circle. That is,  if there exists a homeomorphism  such that .

Thus, a free loop, as opposed to a based loop used in the definition of the fundamental group, is a map from the circle to the space without the basepoint-preserving restriction.  Free homotopy classes of free loops correspond to conjugacy classes in the fundamental group.

Recently, interest in the space of all free loops  has grown with the advent of string topology, i.e. the study of new algebraic structures on the homology of the free loop space.

See also
Loop space
Loop (topology)
Quasigroup

Further reading
 Brylinski, Jean-Luc: Loop spaces, characteristic classes and geometric quantization. Reprint of the 1993 edition. Modern Birkhäuser Classics. Birkhäuser Boston, Inc., Boston, MA, 2008.
 Cohen and Voronov:  Notes on String Topology

Knot theory
Topology